Jean-Claude Raspiengeas (born 1958, Lot-et-Garonne) is a French journalist and literary critic.

Biography 
A graduate from the Institut d'études politiques de Bordeaux, Jean-Claude Raspiengeas turned his attention to publishing with his entry into the editorial bureau of Les Nouvelles littéraires then directed by Philippe Tesson and Jean-François Kahn. From 1984 he worked as senior-reporter for Télérama which he left in 2002 for the daily La Croix of which he became head of the culture department.

Jean-Claude Raspiengeas is also a literary critic on France Inter in the program .

In March 2014 he became grand reporter of the culture department of the newspaperLa Croix.

Publications 
 1995: L'Esprit de résistance, with Serge Ravanel, Éditions du Seuil, .
 1999: Je prends la liberté, with Jacques Gaillot, Flammarion, .
 2001: Bertrand Tavernier, Flammarion, .	
 2001: La Haine antisémite, with Serge Moati, Flammarion, .

References

External links 
 Jean-Claude Raspiengeas on data.bnf.fr
 L’héritage de Barack Obama, par Jean-Claude Raspiengeas on La Croix
 La France oubliée, par Jean-Claude Raspiengeas on La Croix
 Jean-Claude Raspiengeas on France Inter

20th-century French journalists
21st-century French journalists
French literary critics
1958 births
People from Lot-et-Garonne
Living people